Querida (also called Bassick City) is a ghost town in Custer County, Colorado, United States.  The town was built to serve the surrounding silver mines, the most important of which was the Bassick mine.  Querida is Spanish for "beloved."

Geography

Querida is located at  (38.1261125,-105.3344427). Querida is located on the eastern flanks of the Wet Mountain Valley.

See also
List of ghost towns in Colorado

References

External links
Ghosttowns.com: Bassick City or Querida
Full Resolution Ghost Town and Historic Site Photos by Coloradopast.com

Former populated places in Custer County, Colorado
Ghost towns in Colorado